Constitution Avenue, also known as Shahrah-e-Dastoor, is a road in Islamabad, Pakistan.

A number of landmark and government buildings exist along the road, such as the Aiwan-e-Sadr, the Prime Minister's Office, the office of the Ministry of Foreign Affairs, the National Library of Pakistan, the Supreme Court of Pakistan, the Federal Shariat Court, the Cabinet Block, as well as the office of the Auditor General of Pakistan.

The road has often been a site for political protests.

See also
 Islamabad Expressway
 Srinagar Highway
 Seventh Avenue (Islamabad)
 Ninth Avenue (Islamabad)

References

External links
 Capital Development Authority
 Islamabad Administration

Roads in Islamabad
Roads in Islamabad Capital Territory